Andrew Fischer is a marketing specialist.

Andrew or Andy Fischer may also refer to:

Andrew Fischer (singer) in X Factor (Germany season 3)
Andy Fischer (snowboarder), competed in FIS Snowboarding World Championships 2013 – Men's snowboard cross

See also
Andrew Fisher (disambiguation)
Andy Fischer-Price, actor in Kaboom (film)